Bojan Spasojević may refer to:
Bojan Spasojević (footballer, born 1980), Serbian association football forward
Bojan Spasojević (footballer, born 1992), Serbian association football forward